Mohammed Shata is a Nigerian politician who served in the Cabinet of President Olusegun Obasanjo between 1999 and 2003.

Obasanjo cabinet

In July 1999 the Senate cleared the appointment by President Olusegun Obasanjo of Shata as Minister of National Planning.

As Minister of State for Internal Affairs, in September 2000 Shata said that one-third of the 44,000 people awaiting trial in Nigeria were in jail. He said 9,707 prison service officers had been promoted to enhance productivity.
In October 2001 Shata said that Niger and Nigeria would soon launch joint border patrols along their borders to check trans-border crimes.
In November 2001 Shata said the government was planning to issue special identity cards to foreigners living in the country to improve security due to the 11 September attacks in the US.

As Minister of Internal Affairs, in January 2003 Shata blamed "mischief makers" for a report that immigration service officers were planning to go on strike.
The same month, he said preparations for launch of the national identity card system on 18 February were going on smoothly, with 10 billion naira in funding to pay subcontractors.
In May 2003 Shata announced that Nigeria's population was between 160 and 170 million, rather than the projected 120 million, based on matching voter registration and ID card registration numbers.
Dr Mohammed Shata is the Pro-Chancellor Federal University of Technology Akure, Ondo State, Nigeria.

Later career

After he had left office Shata, his predecessor as Internal Affairs Minister Sunday Afolabi and former Labour Minister Hussaini Akwanga were arraigned for alleged corruption related to the National Identity Card plan. They were granted bail in December 2003.
The first National Secretary of the People's Democratic Party (PDP), former Governor of Enugu State, Okwesilieze Nwodo and the Permanent Secretary of the Ministry of Internal Affairs were also granted bail.

References

RELIGION          = Islam

Living people
Federal ministers of Nigeria
1950 births